Ashton railway station was a railway station serving the village of Ashton in Devon, England. It was located on the Teign Valley line.

History
The station was opened on 9 October 1882 as the northern terminus of the Teign Valley Railway when it opened from Heathfield junction on the Moretonhampstead and South Devon Railway.

The station had a timber platform and a raised causeway for access when the Teign flooded. An engine shed and signal box were located to the south of the station and the goods yard was equipped with a 2 ton crane.

The station was host to a GWR camp coach from 1934 to 1939. A camping coach was also positioned here by the Western Region in 1952.

The station closed on 9 June 1958.

The site today
The former station is now a private house. Part of the goods yard crane remains in an adjacent farmyard.

References

Bibliography

Further reading
 
 

Disused railway stations in Devon
Former Great Western Railway stations
Railway stations in Great Britain opened in 1882
Railway stations in Great Britain closed in 1958